Ahmadpur Junction railway station is an important junction railway station under Howrah railway division of Eastern Railway zone. It is the connecting station of Sahibganj loop line and Ahmadpur–Katwa line. It is situated beside Suri road at Ahmedpur in Birbhum district in the Indian state of West Bengal. Total 46 Express and passengers trains stop at Ahmadpur Junction railway station.

Trains
Major Trains available from this railway station are as follows:
 Sealdah-Alipurduar Kanchan Kanya Express
 Sealdah-Bamanhat Uttar Banga Express
 Sealdah–Silchar Kanchenjunga Express
 Howrah-Azimganj Ganadevata Express
 Howrah–Malda Town Intercity Express
 Sealdah–Agartala Kanchenjunga Express
 Howrah–Rampurhat Express
 Howrah–Azimganj Kavi Guru Express

References

Railway stations in Birbhum district
Howrah railway division
Railway junction stations in West Bengal